Case Dismissed – The Introduction of G-Unit South is a mixtape by rapper Young Buck, Hosted by DJ Drama. DJ Drama celebrates Young Buck's legal victory in his case resulting from his arrest at the VIBE Awards with this huge mixtape introduction to the new G-Unit South branch. Cashville's own lays down mad exclusive freestyles and tracks while also acquainting you with the talent coming out of Ca$hville Records stable: D-Tay, Lil Murda, Hi-C, Lil Scrappy, All Star Cashville Prince, and more. It was released on August 29, 2006. On mixtape website DatPiff, it has been certified Bronze for being downloaded over 25,000 times.

Background
The Mixtape was 1 of 3 released by Young Buck to promote his upcoming 2007 album Buck The World (the other two being Welcome To The Traphouse & Chronic 2006)

Track list

References
 
 

2006 mixtape albums